Dovyalis is a genus of shrubs and small trees. Recent genetic evidence has shown the genus to belong to the family Salicaceae; formerly it was classified in the family Flacourtiaceae. The 15 species are native to Africa (Ethiopia south to South Africa) and southern Asia (India, Sri Lanka). Some are cultivated for their fruit.

Description
They are dense, thorny plants growing to 3–6 m tall, with sharp, 3–6 cm long stem spines in the leaf axils. Buds at the base of the spine produce clusters of alternately arranged simple ovate leaves 3–10 cm long.

The flowers are inconspicuous, solitary or clustered, with no petals. They are dioecious, with male and female flowers on separate plants. The fruit is an edible, yellow to purple globose berry 2–4 cm diameter, containing several small seeds. They are very juicy and with an acidic flavour.

Cultivation and uses
Several species are grown for their fruit; D. caffra (Umkokola or Kei-apple) is popular in southern Africa, and D. hebecarpa (Kitembilla) in India and Sri Lanka. Some, notably D. abyssinica, are also grown as ornamental plants and as hedges, where the spines are valued for deterring intrusion by livestock or burglars.

The tropical apricot, or ketcot, is a hybrid between D. hebecarpa and D. abyssinica that was developed in Florida in 1953 and is cultivated for its fruit.

References

 
Salicaceae genera
Dioecious plants